Fedoseevtsy, also Fedoseyans (федосеевцы, феодосиевцы in Russian), sometimes anglicised as Theodosians, comprise a dissident religious movement formed in Imperial Russia. They have become one of the denominations among the Bespopovtsy (the priestless Old Believers).

The Fedoseevtsy movement, founded by an ex-deacon  (1661-1711), originated amidst Old Believers (mostly peasants and posad people) in Northwest Russia. The Fedoseevtsy disapproved of a certain group within the Bespopovtsy, namely the Pomortsy, who had been diverging from the strict principles of the Old Believers and had adopted the custom of praying for the Tsar (моление за царя). Initially, the Fedoseevtsy were irreconcilable towards   serfdom in Russia and observed strict asceticism, negating the institution of marriage. With the development of social inequality among the Fedoseevtsy, their doctrine gradually began to lose its elements of social protest. In 1848 they adopted the custom of praying for the Tsar. In the second half of the 19th century, a group of the so-called "newlyweds" (новожёны) detached itself from the Fedoseevtsy movement, acknowledging the institution of marriage.

Further reading 
 Быковский И. К. Преображенский приход старообрядцев-феодосиевцев старопоморского благочестия в Москве. — М.: 1907.
 Миловидов В. Ф. Старообрядчество в прошлом и настоящем. — М.: 1969.
 Подмазов А. Современное старообрядчество в Латвии. — Рига: 1969.
 Попов Н. И. Из истории Преображенского кладбища. — М.: 1862.
 Попов Н. И. Материалы для истории беспоповских согласий в Москве, феодосиевцев Преображенского кладбища и поморского монинского согласия. — М.: 1870.
 Попов Н. И. Сборник для истории старообрядчества. Т. 1 — М.: 1864.
 Преображенское кладбище и его прошлое . — М.: Тов. типографии А. И. Мамонтова, 1901. − 64 с.

External links
 Fedoseevtsy website

Old Believer movement